The Pittsgrove Township School District is a comprehensive community public school district that serves students in pre-kindergarten through twelfth grade from Pittsgrove Township and Elmer borough, in Salem County, New Jersey, United States.

As of the 2021–22 school year, the district, comprised of five schools, had an enrollment of 1,686 students and 138.7 classroom teachers (on an FTE basis), for a student–teacher ratio of 12.2:1.

Students from Elmer attend the district as part of a full sending/receiving relationship in which the former Elmer School is integrated into the district and Elmer and Pittsgrove Township students attend school together throughout their education.

The district is classified by the New Jersey Department of Education as being in District Factor Group "CD", the sixth-highest of eight groupings. District Factor Groups organize districts statewide to allow comparison by common socioeconomic characteristics of the local districts. From lowest socioeconomic status to highest, the categories are A, B, CD, DE, FG, GH, I and J.

Schools
Schools in the district (with 2021–22 enrollment data from the National Center for Education Statistics) are:

Elementary schools
Norma Elementary School with 97 students in grades PreK-K
Dr. Priscilla Ocasio-Jiménez
Elmer Elementary School with 214 students in grades 1-2)
Daniel F. Bruce, Principal
Olivet Elementary School with 333 students in grades 3-5
Tino Monti, Principal
Middle school
Pittsgrove Township Middle School with 496 students in grades 6-8
Ryan Hudson, Principal
High school
A.P. Schalick High School with 486 students in grades 9-12
Yvette DuBois Trembley, Principal

Administration
Core members of the district's administration are:
Dr. Courtney McNeely, Superintendent
Darren Harris, Business Administrator / Board Secretary

Board of education
The district's board of education, comprised of nine members, sets policy and oversees the fiscal and educational operation of the district through its administration. As a Type II school district, the board's trustees are elected directly by voters to serve three-year terms of office on a staggered basis, with three seats up for election each year held (since 2012) as part of the November general election. The board appoints a superintendent to oversee the district's day-to-day operations and a business administrator to supervise the business functions of the district. One additional member is appointed to represent the Elmer sending district.

References

External links
Pittsgrove Township School District website

School Data for the Pittsgrove Township School District, National Center for Education Statistics

Elmer, New Jersey
Pittsgrove Township, New Jersey
New Jersey District Factor Group CD
School districts in Salem County, New Jersey